Empusa pennata, or the conehead mantis, is a species of praying mantis in genus Empusa native to the Mediterranean Region. It can be found in Portugal, Spain, southern France, Italy and on the mediterranean coasts of Morocco, Algeria, Tunisia, Libya and Egypt. Because of its cryptic nature, or also possibly because of its fragmented, low density populations, it is rare to encounter in the wild.

General information

Empusa pennata generally has large and thin body along with a great flying apparatus by their pair of wings and light body mass. Also, they are mostly found in perennial herbs and scrubs. There are three ways for insects to find mates: chemical, acoustic, and visual signals. Cryptic coloration is significant to some predatory insects like Mantids, which is used to protect themselves from predators and to capture their prey.

This species of mantis, although similar in size to the common European mantis (Mantis religiosa), is easily distinguished by the protrusion from its crown. Both male and females, even from first hatching carry this tall extension giving them a very alien appearance.

They live in areas that are warm and dry and use their cryptic colouring of either greens and pinks or various shades of brown to keep them hidden from predators. The female may grow to a length of 10 cm while the male is shorter and slimmer. The male has distinctive ‘feather’ type antennae. It overwinters as a nymph and reaches the adult stage by spring. Its eggs have a fast development, especially in the summer months.

Nocturnal pheromone release

However, insects that depend on vision will hinder to find their mate because they will be undetectable to each other. Therefore, as an alternative way to find mates, sex pheromone is used. The releasing of sex pheromone by Empusa pennata is an adaption derived from sexual selection.

Feeding ecology
Mantids stalk their prey and pounce on it, grasping it with their raptorial forelegs. Only living prey is selected and it is consumed directly after the catch. The predator orients itself optically, and therefore only takes notice of moving prey. The maximum size of prey which mantids can overwhelm is species-specific and depends on the prey type. On average mantids eat crickets of 50% their own body weight, while cockroaches can weigh up to 110%.

References

External links
Tree of Life

pennata
Mantodea of Europe
Insects described in 1815